Korean Science Olympiad is a contest to choose representatives of South Korea for the International Science Olympiad. There are:

Korean Mathematical Olympiad

Korean Physics Olympiad

Korean Chemistry Olympiad

Korean Biology Olympiad

Korea Olympiad in Informatics

Korean Astronomy Olympiad

Korea Geography Olympiad

Korean Earth Science Olympiad

Korean Junior Science Olympiad

Korean Youth Physics Tournament

Korean Brain Bee

Korean Linguistics Olympiad

References

Education in South Korea